The 2015 Texas A&M Aggies football team represented Texas A&M University in the 2015 NCAA Division I FBS football season. They played their home games at the newly renovated Kyle Field. They were members of the Western Division of the Southeastern Conference. They were led by fourth year head coach Kevin Sumlin.   The Aggies finished the regular season 8–5 overall and 4–4 in SEC play.  They were invited to the Music City Bowl, where they were defeated by the Louisville Cardinals, 21–27.

Preseason

Recruiting class
In the 2015 recruiting class, Texas A&M signed 25 players, 11 of which were included in the ESPN 300 and 12 in the Scout 300. The class was ranked 12th in the nation by ESPN, 10th by Rivals, 12th by 247, and 10th by Scout.

Personnel

Roster

Schedule
Texas A&M announced their 2015 football schedule on October 14, 2014. The 2015 schedule consist of 9 games in the state of Texas and 3 games outside of the state in the regular season. Two of the nine games in Texas are neutral games against Arizona State and Arkansas. Texas A&M will host SEC foes Alabama, Auburn, Mississippi State, and South Carolina, and will travel to LSU, Ole Miss, and Vanderbilt.

This will be the Aggies' first year without Missouri since 2009 and SMU since 2010 on their schedule.

The Aggies' 25-0 shutout of Vanderbilt on November 21 was Texas A&M's first shutout victory since joining the SEC in 2012. The Aggies had not shut out a team since a 31-0 victory over Wyoming on September 11, 2004, and had not shut out a conference opponent since a 41-0 victory over Baylor on October 12, 2002.

Schedule Source:

Coaching staff

Game summaries

#15 Arizona State

Ball State

The game was the home opener for A&M, and the first game in the newly renovated Kyle Field. The Aggies were dominant throughout the entire first half, with the exception being Ball State's first drive to A&M's 4 yard line.

Nevada

Arkansas

#21 Mississippi State

#10 Alabama

#24 Ole Miss

South Carolina

Auburn

Western Carolina

Vanderbilt

LSU

Louisville

Rankings

References

Texas AandM
Texas A&M Aggies football seasons
Texas AandM Aggies football